HMS Penelope was one of eight  light cruisers built for the Royal Navy in the 1910s. She fought in the First World War, following the war, she was scrapped.

Design and description
The Arethusa-class cruisers were intended to lead destroyer flotillas and defend the fleet against attacks by enemy destroyers.

The main armament of the Arethusa-class ships was two BL 6-inch (152 mm) Mk XII guns that were mounted on the centreline fore and aft of the superstructure and six QF 4-inch Mk V guns in waist mountings. They were also fitted with a single QF 3-pounder  anti-aircraft gun and four  torpedo tubes in two twin mounts.

Construction and career
She was launched on 25 August 1914 at Vickers Limited's shipyard. Unlike her sisters, she carried an extra 4-inch anti-aircraft gun in place of two 3-inch anti-aircraft guns. In August 1915, she was assigned to the 5th Light Cruiser Squadron of the Harwich Force, guarding the eastern approaches to the English Channel. She was repaired and in March 1918 was reassigned to the 7th Light Cruiser Squadron of the Grand Fleet. She survived to the end of the First World War, and was sold for scrap in October 1924 to Stanlee, of Dover.

Notes

Bibliography

External links
 Ships of the Arethusa class

 

Arethusa-class cruisers (1913)
1914 ships
Ships built in Barrow-in-Furness
World War I cruisers of the United Kingdom